Victoria Pavilion may refer to:

 Victoria Pavilion (Fremantle)
 Victoria Arena (Calgary)